Luis T. Diaz Coliseum (Spanish: Coliseo Luis T. Diaz) was the main arena in Aguadilla, Puerto Rico. It is located on Marina Street facing the Atlantic Ocean. Currently seats 2,500+ for basketball & volleyball games and it is the former home of the Las Divas de Aguadilla of the Female Superior Volleyball League. Named after Luis T. Diaz who taught sports to the youth of the city. Formerly home to the Aguadilla Sharks of the National Superior Basketball League as well.

History
The Coliseum opened to the public in 1971 as the main arena in the city hosting many events like Basketball games, Volleyball games, Pro Wrestling events, Church Gatherings among others.

In the lobby there was a plaque of Luis T. Diaz and in a room showing a lot of trophies from various sports and a picture of the 2006 Aguadilla Divas.

The Coliseum was renovated in 2005 when the city learned that the Divas were coming to play in the building. Also the Coliseum hosts city activities, Pro Wrestling events from both IWA, Caribbean Pro Wrestling and the WWC, Elementary, Middle & High School Graduation Celebrations.

After Hurricane Maria in 2017, the coliseum remained closed and abandoned.

References

Indoor arenas in Puerto Rico
Basketball venues in Puerto Rico
Buildings and structures in Aguadilla, Puerto Rico
Volleyball venues in Puerto Rico
1971 establishments in Puerto Rico
Sports venues completed in 1971